Carl Fellstrom (born 1964 in Sutton Coldfield) is a British journalist, writer and broadcaster who specialises in crime and investigations.  He has written for all the major UK national newspapers contributing particularly to the Sunday Times, The Observer, Sunday Telegraph and Daily Mail.

He has also worked for the BBC and Channel 4 on documentaries including assistant producer for Undercover Prisoner for the Dispatches series which highlighted life inside one of Britain's prisons.  In December 2008, he published the highly acclaimed and controversial book Hoods, a best selling in depth study of gun crime, drugs and gangsters in the city of Nottingham.

References

External links

 

1964 births
British reporters and correspondents
Daily Mail journalists
Living people
The Sunday Times people